Dark Ages is the fifth studio album by American heavy metal band Soulfly. It was released on October 4, 2005.

Album information
The album explores aggression and dark themes to mourn the deaths of Max Cavalera's 8-month-old grandson, Moses, and his close friend Dimebag Darrell. Dark Ages was recorded in five countries – Serbia, Turkey, Russia, France, and the United States. Cavalera praised this album by calling it "unorthodox metal".

Songs
The album opens with an intro track "The Dark Ages", which continues into "Babylon", which explores worldwide chaos. "Arise Again" combines Metallica-like riffs and Sepultura-like echoes.

"Corrosion Creeps" is dedicated to Chuck Schuldiner of Death. "Fuel the Hate" begins with the lyric line 'Monday, July 16, 1945, 5:30am', exact time and date when 'Trinity' nuclear test occurred. It was around this time that the lyrical themes began to move away from the earlier spiritual themes and began incorporating more violent and aggressive elements. Richie Cavalera, Max's son, co-sings on "Staystrong" as a tribute to youthful deaths of Moses and Dana.

The outro for "Bleak" was recorded in an ancient temple in Istanbul to capture echoes to include as common sound effect on this album. "Molotov" lyrics are in Russian, Portuguese, and a final verse in English. The performance of Billy Milano, one of two guests for "Molotov", was recorded over the phone by Max. "Riotstarter" contains strong tribal  chants, and "Innerspirit" blends clean and melodic vocals by the guest Coyote over the roars by Cavalera.

Reception

AllMusic had a positive response, because the album has greater complexity of metal than any of the previous album, thus refreshing the band with veterans present.
Blogcritics had a very good response, as "Cavalera is screaming louder and harder than ever throughout. He's raging harder and in a higher range than he's been in years, and it's a welcome improvement."

Track listing

Personnel

Soulfly
Max Cavalera - vocals, 4-string guitar, berimbau, sitar, didgeridoo
Marc Rizzo - lead guitar, flamenco guitar
Bobby Burns - bass
Joe Nunez - drums, percussion

Additional musicians
Kerry King - lead guitar on "Frontlines"
Nemanja "Coyote" Kojić - vocals on "Innerspirit"
Pavel Fillipenko - vocals on "Molotov"
Billy Milano - vocals  on "Molotov"
David Ellefson - bass on "Riotstarter"
Richie Cavalera - vocals on "Staystrong"
Stefane Goldman - sitar, mandolin, acoustic guitar, keyboards
Alexander Yushin - bayan
Alexsander Hrenov - balalaika, wooden spoons, treshchotka
Vitaly Hrenov - contrabass balalaika
John Gray - synth programming

Production
Max Cavalera - production
John Gray - recording, engineering, digital editing, mixing on "Molotov" and "(The) March", additional mixing on "Soulfly V"
John Bilberry - assistant engineering
Matt Marksbary - assistant engineering
Justin Salter - assistant engineering
Terry Date - mixing
June Murakawa - assisting
Milan "Bare" Barković - engineering
Alexkid - engineering
Darya Jubenko - engineering
Gloria Cavalera - executive production
Ted Jensen - mastering
Monte Conner - A&R

Management
Gloria Cavalera - management
Christina Stojanovic - management

Artwork
Michael Whelan - illustrations
Mr. Scott Design - art direction
Leo Zuletta - Soulfly logo

Chart positions

References

Soulfly albums
2005 albums
Roadrunner Records albums
Albums produced by Max Cavalera
Albums with cover art by Michael Whelan